In physics, the cluster decomposition property states that experiments carried out far from each other cannot influence each other. Usually applied to quantum field theory, it requires that vacuum expectation values of operators localized in bounded regions factorize whenever these regions becomes sufficiently distant from each other. First formulated by Eyvind H. Wichmann and James H. Crichton in 1963 in the context of the S-matrix, it was conjectured by Steven Weinberg that in the low energy limit the cluster decomposition property, together with Lorentz invariance and quantum mechanics, inevitably lead to quantum field theory. String theory satisfies all three of the conditions and so provides a counter-example against this being true at all energy scales.

Formulation 

The S-matrix  describes the amplitude for a process with an initial state  evolving into a final state .

as the distance between the two clusters increases. The physical interpretation of this is that any two spatially well separated experiments  and  cannot influence each other. This condition is fundamental to the ability to doing physics without having to know the state of the entire universe. By expanding the S-matrix into a sum of a product of connected S-matrix elements , which at the perturbative level are equivalent to connected Feynman diagrams, the cluster decomposition property can be restated as demanding that connected S-matrix elements must vanish whenever some of its clusters of particles are far apart from each other.

This position space formulation can also be reformulated in terms of the momentum space S-matrix . Since its Fourier transformation gives the position space connected S-matrix, this only depends on position through the exponential terms. Therefore, performing a uniform translation in a direction  on a subset of particles will effectively change the momentum space S-matrix as

By translational invariance, a translation of all particles cannot change the S-matrix, therefore  must be proportional to a momentum conserving delta function  to ensure that the translation exponential factor vanishes. If there is an additional delta function of only a subset of momenta corresponding to some cluster of particles, then this cluster can be moved arbitrarily far through a translation without changing the S-matrix, which would violate cluster decomposition. This means that in momentum space the property requires that the S-matrix only has a single delta function.

Cluster decomposition can also be formulated in terms of correlation functions, where for any two operators  and  localized to some region, the vacuum expectation values factorize as the two operators become distantly separated

This formulation allows for the property to be applied to theories that lack an S-matrix such as conformal field theories. It is in terms of these Wightman functions that the property is usually formulated in axiomatic quantum field theory. In some formulations, such as Euclidean constructive field theory, it is explicitly introduced as an axiom.

Properties 

If a theory is constructed from creation and annihilation operators, then the cluster decomposition property automatically holds. This can be seen by expanding out the S-matrix as a sum of Feynman diagrams which allows for the identification of connected S-matrix elements with connected Feynman diagrams. Vertices arise whenever creation and annihilation operators commute past each other leaving behind a single momentum delta function. In any connected diagram with V vertices, I internal lines and L loops, I-L of the delta functions go into fixing internal momenta, leaving V-(I-L) delta functions unfixed. A form of Euler's formula states that any graph with C disjoint connected components satisfies C = V-I+L. Since the connected S-matrix elements correspond to C=1 diagrams, these only have a single delta function and thus the cluster decomposition property, as formulated above in momentum space in terms of delta functions, holds.

Microcausality, the locality condition requiring commutation relations of local operators to vanish for spacelike separations, is a sufficient condition for the S-matrix to satisfy cluster decomposition. In this sense cluster decomposition serves a similar purpose for the S-matrix as microcausality does for fields, preventing causal influence from propagating between regions that are distantly separated. However, cluster decomposition is weaker than having no superluminal causation since it can be formulated for classical theories as well.

One key requirement for cluster decomposition is that it requires a unique vacuum state, with it failing if the vacuum state is a mixed state.

References

Quantum field theory
Axiomatic quantum field theory
Theorems in quantum mechanics